Lars Traber (born 12 June 2000) is a Liechtensteiner footballer who plays as a defender for Swiss Challenge League club FC Vaduz and the Liechtenstein national team.

Club career
Traber moved from the youth sides of St. Gallen to FC Wil in summer 2019. He went on to make nine appearances for the club in the Swiss Challenge League before his contract was terminated by mutual consent in August 2020. He subsequently signed for Swiss Promotion League club SC Brühl. 

It was announced on 13 June 2022 that Traber would be joining FC Vaduz on a free transfer.

International career
Born in Switzerland, Traber is of Liechtenstein descent through his grandmother. He received his Liechtenstein passport in early March 2022. Shortly thereafter he was named to Liechtenstein's squad for friendlies against Cape Verde and the Faroe Islands in Spain. He went on to make his senior international in the match against Cape Verde on 25 March.

International statistics

References

External links

National Football Teams profile

2000 births
Living people
People from Rorschach, Switzerland
Liechtenstein footballers
Liechtenstein international footballers
Swiss men's footballers
Swiss people of Liechtenstein descent
People with acquired Liechtenstein citizenship
Association football defenders
FC Wil players
Swiss Challenge League players
Sportspeople from the canton of St. Gallen